Otter Lake Water Aerodrome  is located adjacent to Missinipe on Otter Lake, Saskatchewan, Canada.

See also 
 Otter Lake Airport
 List of airports in Saskatchewan

References 

Registered aerodromes in Saskatchewan
Seaplane bases in Saskatchewan